The list of Uruguayan footballers in Serie A records the association football players from Uruguay who have appeared at least once for a team in the Italian Serie A. Entries in bold denote players still active in actual season.

A
Julio Abbadie – Genoa, Lecco – 1956–62
Nelson Abeijón – Cagliari, Atalanta – 1998–2000, 2004–07
Mathías Abero – Bologna – 2012–13
Carlos Aguilera – Genoa, Torino – 1989–94
Rodrigo Aguirre – Empoli, Udinese – 2014–16
Matias Aguirregaray – Palermo – 2011–12
Vincente Albanese – Bologna – 1937–38
Emiliano Alfaro – Lazio – 2011–12
Juan Alberti – Venezia – 1939–47
Agustín Álvarez – Sassuolo – 2022–
Pablo Álvarez – Reggina – 2007–09
Nicolás Amodio – Napoli – 2008–09
Germán Antonioli – Fiorentina – 1932–33
Joaquín Ardaiz – Frosinone – 2018–19
Felipe Avenatti – Bologna – 2017–18

B
Jaime Báez – Cremonese – 2022–23
Raúl Banfi – Modena, Juventus – 1939–40, 1941–42
Rubén Bentancourt – Atalanta – 2013–14
Rodrigo Bentancur – Juventus – 2017–22
Joe Bizera – Cagliari – 2005–08
Mariano Bogliacino – Napoli, Chievo – 2007–11
Miguel Britos – Bologna, Napoli – 2008–15
Gastón Brugman – Palermo, Pescara, Parma – 2015–17, 2019–21

C

Leandro Cabrera – Crotone – 2017–18
Matías Cabrera – Cagliari – 2012–14
Washington Cacciavillani – Pro Patria, Inter – 1955–56, 1957–58
Martín Cáceres – Juventus, Verona, Lazio, Fiorentina, Cagliari – 2009–10, 2011–16, 2017–22
Pablo Cáceres – Torino – 2012–13
Ricardo Canals – Vicenza – 1997–98
Nelson Cancela – Atalanta – 1956–57
Dandolo Candales – Napoli – 1947–48
Jorge Caraballo – Pisa – 1982–83
Mathías Cardacio – Milan – 2008–09
Fabián Carini – Inter, Cagliari – 2004–06
Jorge Daniel Casanova – Lecce – 1999–2000
Edinson Cavani – Palermo, Napoli – 2006–13
Pablo Cepellini – Cagliari – 2010–13
Angel Cerilla – Napoli – 1947–48
Javier Chevantón – Lecce, Atalanta – 2001–02, 2003–04, 2009–11
Alejandro Correa – Brescia – 2000–04
Sebastián Cristóforo – Fiorentina – 2016–18, 2019–20

D
Héctor Demarco – Bologna, Vicenza – 1959–68

F
César Falletti – Bologna – 2017–18
Maximiliano Faotto – Palermo, Lazio, Napoli – 1932–36, 1937–42
Daniel Fonseca – Cagliari, Napoli, Roma, Juventus, Como – 1990–99, 2000–01, 2002–03
Diego Forlán – Inter – 2011–12
Enzo Francescoli – Cagliari, Torino – 1990–94
José María Franco – Torino – 2001–03
Ricardo Alberto Frione – Inter – 1932–33

G
José García – Bologna, Atalanta – 1949–56
Pablo García – Milan, Venezia – 2000–02
Walter Gargano – Napoli, Inter, Parma – 2007–15
Guillermo Giacomazzi – Lecce, Palermo, Empoli – 2001–02, 2003–09, 2010–12
Henry Giménez – Bologna – 2009–13
Diego Godín – Inter, Cagliari – 2019–22
Mauro Goicoechea – Roma – 2012–13
Walter Gómez – Palermo – 1956–57
Alejandro González – Verona, Cagliari – 2013–15
Álvaro González – Lazio, Torino – 2010–15
Pablo Granoche – Chievo, Novara – 2009–12
Carlos Grossmüller – Lecce – 2010–12
Homero Guaglianone – Lazio – 1960–61
Gianni Guigou – Roma, Siena, Fiorentina, Treviso – 2000–06
Nelson Gutiérrez – Lazio, Verona – 1988–90

H
Abel Hernández – Palermo – 2008–13
José Herrera – Cagliari, Atalanta – 1990–97

I
Oliviero Icardi – Palermo, Bari – 1935–36, 1937–38
Salvador Ichazo – Torino – 2014–16, 2018–19

L
Luis La Paz – Napoli – 1947–48
Diego Laxalt – Bologna, Empoli, Genoa, Milan, Torino – 2013–20
Mauricio Lemos – Sassuolo – 2017–19
Roberto Leopardi – Genoa, Vicenza – 1957–60
Norberto Liguera – Bologna – 1937–38
Diego López – Cagliari – 1998–2000, 2004–10
Nicolás López – Roma, Udinese, Verona – 2012–15
Ignacio Lores – Palermo – 2011–12

M 

Federico Magallanes – Atalanta, Venezia, Torino – 1996–98, 2001–03
Andrés Martínez – Lecce, Bologna – 1997–98
Jorge Martínez – Catania, Juventus, Cesena – 2007–12
Matías Masiero – Genoa – 2007–08
Leonardo Melazzi – Genoa – 2012–13
Gustavo Méndez – Vicenza, Torino – 1995–2000
Leonardo Migliónico – Sampdoria, Livorno, Lecce – 2007–08, 2009–10, 2011–12
Paolo Montero – Atalanta, Juventus – 1992–94, 1995–2005
Romualdo Moro – Napoli – 1956–57
Fernando Muslera – Lazio – 2007–11

N
Nahitan Nández – Cagliari – 2019–22

O
Fabián O'Neill – Cagliari, Juventus, Perugia – 1995–97, 1998–2002
Francisco Occhiuzzi – Bologna – 1932–34
Christian Oliva – Cagliari – 2019–21
Mathías Olivera – Napoli – 2022–
Rubén Olivera – Juventus, Sampdoria, Genoa, Lecce, Fiorentina – 2002–03, 2004–05, 2006–09, 2010–14
Maximiliano Olivera – Fiorentina – 2016–18, 2019–21
Marcelo Otero – Vicenza – 1995–99

P
Antonio Pacheco – Inter – 2000–01
Rubén Paz – Genoa – 1989–90
Luis Alberto Pedemonte – Inter – 1946–47
Horacio Peralta – Cagliari – 2004–05
José Perdomo – Genoa – 1989–90
Álvaro Pereira – Inter – 2012–14
Rubén Pereira – Cremonese – 1991–92
Gastón Pereiro – Cagliari – 2019–22
Diego Pérez – Bologna – 2010–14
Pedro Petrone – Fiorentina – 1931–33
Diego Polenta – Genoa – 2010–11
Hugo Esteban Porta – Bologna – 1939–40
Richard Porta – Siena – 2007–08

R

Gastón Ramírez – Bologna, Sampdoria – 2010–12, 2017–21
Juan Manuel Ramos – Spezia – 2020–21
Álvaro Recoba – Inter, Venezia, Torino – 1997–2008
Nicolas Riccardi – Palermo – 1935–36, 1937–39
Egidio Arévalo Ríos – Palermo – 2012–13
Martín Rivas – Inter, Perugia – 1997–99
Cristian Rodríguez – Parma – 2014–15
Diego Martín Rodríguez – Udinese – 2012–13
Diego Rodríguez Da Luz – Bologna – 2008–09
Federico Rodríguez – Bologna – 2013–14
Guillermo Rodríguez – Cesena, Torino, Verona – 2011–15
Ribair Rodríguez – Siena – 2012–13
Alexis Rolín – Catania – 2012–14
Marcel Román – Genoa – 2008–09
Luis Romero – Cagliari – 1996–97

S
Marcelo Saralegui – Torino – 1992–93
Vicente Sarni – Fiorentina – 1932–33
Martín Satriano – Inter, Empoli – 2021–
Héctor Scarone – Inter, Palermo – 1931–35
Nicolás Schiappacasse – Parma, Sassuolo – 2018–19, 2020–21
Carlos Servetti – Genoa – 1937–39
Darío Silva – Cagliari – 1995–97
Gastón Silva – Torino – 2014–16
Santiago Silva – Fiorentina – 2011–12
Gonzalo Sorondo – Inter – 2001–02
Joaquín Sosa – Bologna – 2022–
Rubén Sosa – Lazio, Inter – 1988–95
Cristhian Stuani – Reggina – 2007–09

T
Marcelo Tejera – Cagliari – 1992–93
Lucas Torreira – Sampdoria, Fiorentina – 2016–18, 2021–22

V
Carlos Valdez – Treviso, Reggina – 2005–06, 2007–09
Matías Vecino – Fiorentina, Cagliari, Empoli, Inter, Lazio – 2013–
Waldemar Victorino – Cagliari – 1982–83
Ernesto Vidal – Fiorentina, Pro Patria – 1953–56
Matías Viña – Roma – 2021–23
Tabaré Viudez – Milan – 2008–09
Tomaso Luis Volpi – Inter – 1946–47

Z
Marcelo Zalayeta – Juventus, Empoli, Perugia, Napoli, Bologna – 1997–99, 2001–06, 2007–10
Bibiano Zapirain – Inter – 1946–48

See also
List of foreign Serie A players
List of Uruguayan footballers in Serie B
Oriundo
Serie A Foreign Footballer of the Year

Notes

References

Italy
Serie A footballers
Expatriate footballers in Italy
Uruguayan expatriate footballers
Uruguayan expatriate footballers
Association football player non-biographical articles